Music and Its Double is an album composed by John Zorn and featuring three contemporary compositions which were recorded in late 2011 and early 2012 in New York City and Finland, released on the Tzadik label in October 2012. The first track dedicated to composer György Ligeti, "À Rebours", was recorded at the Miller Theatre by cellist Fred Sherry and ensemble conducted by Brad Lubman. The four movements of "Ceremonial Magic" are 2012 studio recordings by David Fulmer and Kenny Wollesen and the final composition, "La Machine de L'Être" inspired by Antonin Artaud, was recorded by the Lahti Symphony Orchestra in 2011.

Track listing
All compositions by John Zorn
 "À Rebours" - 11:12   
 "Ceremonial Magic I" - 5:37   
 "Ceremonial Magic II" - 4:07   
 "Ceremonial Magic III" - 5:52   
 "Ceremonial Magic IV" - 4:03   
 "La Machine de L'Être: Tetème" - 4:10   
 "La Machine de L'Être: Le Révélé" - 3:26   
 "La Machine de L'Être:  Entremêlés" - 4:04

Personnel
Track 1:
Fred Sherry - cello
Jennifer Choi - violin 
David Fulmer - viola
Mike Nicolas - cello
June Han - harp
Tara Helen O'Connor - flute 
Josh Rubin - clarinet 
Al Lipowski, Joe Pereira, William Winant - percussion 
Brad Lubman - conductor

Tracks 2-5: 
David Fulmer - violin 
Kenny Wollesen - drums

Tracks 6-8:
Anu Komsi - soprano 
Lahti Symphony Orchestra conducted by Sakari Oramo

References
 

2012 albums
John Zorn albums
Albums produced by John Zorn
Tzadik Records albums